Viduthalai, marketed as Viduthalai Part 1, is an upcoming Tamil-language period crime thriller film written and directed by Vetrimaaran. Produced by Elred Kumar under the banners of RS Infotainment. The film stars  Soori and Vijay Sethupathi . This film was presented by RS Infotainment. The film is adapted from short story Thunaivan written by Jeyamohan.

Premise 
Kumaresan, a police constable gets recruited for "Operation Ghosthunt", which is implanted to capture Perumal "Vaathiyar", who leads a separatist group "People's Army" which are highly dedicated to fighting against the authorities for commiting atrocities against innocent village women in the name of police interrogations.

Cast 

 Source: The Telegraph (India)

Soori as Kumaresan, a police constable
Vijay Sethupathi as Perumal "Vaathiyaar"
Gautham Vasudev Menon
Saravana Subbiah
Bhavani Sre
Prakash Raj as Prabhakaran
Rajiv Menon as A.Subramaniyan
Chetan
Ilavarasu
Munnar Ramesh

Production

Development 
During the pre-production works of Vaadivaasal, Vetrimaaran was reported to collaborate with Soori for another project in July 2019, due to the extensive pre-production of the former. Vetrimaaran decided to adapt late Na. Muthukumar's short story Pattamppoochi Virpavan and later opted for Meeran Moideen's novel Ajnabi, which involved multiple foreign locations such as Oman, Qatar and Saudi Arabia. In April 2020, due to the restrictions in air travel in order to curb COVID-19 pandemic, Vetrimaaran had decided to make changes in the script and used the lockdown period for pre-production works. Media reports later claimed that, Vetrimaaran had adapted the short story Thunaivan written by B. Jeyamohan, with the film being titled the same. However, the makers decided to title the film as Viduthalai, which was officially confirmed on 21 April 2021 with the first look being released. Originally intended as a single film, it was later split into two parts.

Casting 
In January 2021, Vijay Sethupathi joined the film's cast and also shot few portions during the commencement of the shoot, thus marking his first collaboration with Vetrimaaran. Vetrimaaran revealed that Sethupathi would play the role of Soori's mentor in the film, which is said to be a crucial one, although Soori plays a crucial part in the story. The team recreated Sethupathi's character, which is based on Vaathiyaar, a member from Tamil Desiyam Group. While Soori's character is based on the Indian bandit Veerappan, the team rubbished the rumours clarifying that there is no connection of Veerappan with the script.

Bharathiraja was reported to join the film in his first collaboration with Vetrimaaran, although he was replaced by Kishore during the filming of the first schedule. Ilaiyaraaja was reported to compose music for the film marking his first collaboration with Vetrimaaran. In January 2021, Bhavani Sre, sister of composer G. V. Prakash Kumar was announced playing the female lead, in her third feature film after Ka Pae Ranasingam and Paava Kadhaigal. In April 2021, Gautham Vasudev Menon was reported to play the role of a cop in the film.

Filming 
The team moved to Sathyamangalam forest to shoot major sequences featuring Soori during December 2020, and filming eventually began on 4 January 2021. Bharathiraja opted out of this schedule citing the climatic conditions, which led Vetrimaaran to replace him with Kishore. The entire film has been shot in an iPhone, which is used in order to control production costs. The shooting of the film took place in Sathyamangalam for three months, and the team moved to Chengalpattu in April 2021, in which the team erected a huge police camp set, and shooting of the film happened for 20 days. The team later planned to shoot the last leg of the film at Sathyamangalam after the COVID-19 lockdown. Principal photography wrapped by 31 December 2022.

Music 

The films soundtrack is composed by Ilaiyaraaja.

Ilaiyaraaja in his maiden collaboration with Vetrimaaran. Ilaiyaraaja composed the song of the film in his newly launched music studio in Kodambakkam, after his fallout with Prasad Studios where he recorded songs for nearly four decades; It marks his first work being recorded at his new studio where music composition of the film began in February 2021. As of May 2021, Ilaiyaraaja recorded three out of eight songs being planned for the film and are touted to be "situational numbers" as per sources. The music rights were purchased by Sony Music India. The first single titled "Onnada Nadandhaa" released on 8 February 2023.

Release 
The distribution rights for Tamil Nadu were acquired by Red Giant Movies, while the digital rights of the film were acquired by ZEE5. The satellite rights of the film were acquired by Kalaignar TV. The overseas distribution rights for UK and Europe were acquired by Ahimsa Entertainment. The film is confirmed to release on 31 March.

References

External links 
 

Films based on Indian novels
Films directed by Vetrimaaran
Films scored by Ilaiyaraaja
Indian crime thriller films
Indian police films
Upcoming films
Upcoming Tamil-language films